Daniyar Zhandosuly Kairov (Daniiar Jandosūly Qaiyrov; born 5 April 1994) is a Kazakh professional ice hockey defenceman currently playing for the Barys Astana in the Kontinental Hockey League (KHL).

Career
Kairov started his career with the Torpedo Oskemen in the Kazakhstan Hockey Championship in 2010. He was drafted in the first round 19th overall in the 2011 KHL Junior Draft by the SKA Saint Petersburg. On 6 June 2011, his rights were traded to the Barys Astana for 2nd and 3rd round draft picks in 2012. Next year, he joined to Barys Astana system, to play in its junior team Snezhnye Barsy. During the 2012–13 MHL season, Kairov was selected to play in the MHL Challenge Cup. On 15 January 2013, he made his KHL debut in the match against the Ugra Khanty-Mansiysk.

Career statistics

Regular season and playoffs

International

References

External links

1994 births
Living people
Sportspeople from Oskemen
Kazakhstani ice hockey defencemen
Nomad Astana players
Snezhnye Barsy players
Barys Nur-Sultan players